Bellodi is an Italian surname. Notable people with the surname include:
 Gabriele Bellodi (born 2000), Italian footballer
 Mirko Bellodi (born 1973), Italian footballer

Italian-language surnames